Tributaries: Reflections on Tommy Flanagan is a solo album by pianist Sir Roland Hanna performing compositions associated with Tommy Flanagan recorded in 2002 and released by IPO Recordings.

Reception

In his "Jazz Consumer Guide" for The Village Voice, Tom Hull said of this collaboration: "All of Hanna's solo albums are thoughtful, but his fellow Detroiter sets the bar higher than ever." In another commentary published on his website, he said "both were meticulous craftsmen, and were especially adroit accompanists. This is solo, of course. The subject and the extra care raise it a bit above Hanna's usual high standard."

AllMusic reviewer Scott Yanow stated "It is difficult to believe in listening to Tributaries: Reflections on Tommy Flanagan, a solo recital by Sir Roland Hanna, that the pianist passed away just five months later. Hanna's tribute to the recently deceased Flanagan is so full of life, creativity, and swing. ... every selection on this set is well worth hearing. There can be little doubt after hearing this highly recommended CD that Hanna was very much in his playing prime up until the end of his productive life".

Track listing
All compositions by Tommy Flanagan except where noted
 "Sea Changes" – 4:22
 "A Child Is Born" (Thad Jones) – 6:50
 "Body and Soul" (Johnny Green, Frank Eyton, Edward Heyman, Robert Sour) – 8:28
 "Soon" (George Gershwin, Ira Gershwin) – 4:43
 "Things Ain't What They Used to Be" (Mercer Ellington) – 5:29
 "Never Let Me Go" (Jay Livingston, Ray Evans) – 7:00
 "The Cup Bearers" (Tom McIntosh) – 7:25
 "'Tis" (Jones) – 4:33
 "I Concentrate on You" (Cole Porter) – 6:37
 "Robin's Nest"  (Illinois Jacquet, Bob Russell, Sir Charles Thompson) – 4:03
 "Delarna" – 5:18

Personnel 
Sir Roland Hanna – piano

References 

2003 albums
Roland Hanna albums
Tommy Flanagan tribute albums